Charles Adain Ingram (March 19, 1867December 9, 1937) was an American lawyer and progressive Republican politician from Pepin County, Wisconsin.  He served as the 44th speaker of the Wisconsin State Assembly, and represented Buffalo and Pepin counties in the Assembly for three terms.

Biography
Born in Waubeek, Wisconsin, Ingram graduated from University of Wisconsin–Madison and then taught school. Ingram then graduated from University of Wisconsin Law School and then practiced law and was in the publication business. Ingram was district attorney of Pepin County, Wisconsin, and then served in the Wisconsin State Assembly 1907-1913 as a Progressive Republican and served as speaker of the Wisconsin Assembly in the 1911 session. He then went back to his law firm and publication business.

He died in Durand, Wisconsin, on December 9, 1937.

References

1867 births
1937 deaths
People from Pepin County, Wisconsin
University of Wisconsin–Madison alumni
University of Wisconsin Law School alumni
Wisconsin lawyers
Wisconsin Republicans
Wisconsin Progressives (1924)
20th-century American politicians
Speakers of the Wisconsin State Assembly